Walter Pilling (18 April 1935 – June 1999) was a British wrestler. He competed at the 1960 Summer Olympics and the 1964 Summer Olympics.

He also represented England and won a silver medal in 57 kg bantamweight division, at the 1962 British Empire and Commonwealth Games in Perth, Western Australia.

References

1935 births
1999 deaths
British male sport wrestlers
Olympic wrestlers of Great Britain
Wrestlers at the 1960 Summer Olympics
Wrestlers at the 1964 Summer Olympics
Sportspeople from Bradford
Commonwealth Games medallists in wrestling
Wrestlers at the 1962 British Empire and Commonwealth Games
Commonwealth Games silver medallists for England
Medallists at the 1962 British Empire and Commonwealth Games